The 2011 NCAA Division III women's basketball tournament was the 30th annual tournament hosted by the NCAA to determine the national champion of Division III women's collegiate basketball in the United States.

Amherst defeated Washington University in St. Louis in the championship game, 64–55, to claim the Lord Jeffs' first Division III national title.

The championship rounds were hosted by Illinois Wesleyan University at the Shirk Center in Bloomington, Illinois.

Bracket

Final Four

All-tournament team
 Caroline Stedman, Amherst
 Jaci Daigneault, Amherst
 Kathryn Berger, Washington University in St. Louis
 Chelsie Schweers, Christopher Newport
 Nikki Preston, Illinois Wesleyan

See also
 2011 NCAA Division I women's basketball tournament
 2011 NCAA Division II women's basketball tournament
 2011 NAIA Division I women's basketball tournament
 2011 NAIA Division II women's basketball tournament
 2011 NCAA Division III men's basketball tournament

References

 
NCAA Division III women's basketball tournament
2011 in sports in Illinois
Amherst Mammoths
Washington University Bears